Empis morenae is a species of fly in the family Empididae. It is included in the subgenus Euempis. It is found in the  Palearctic.

References

Empis
Diptera of Europe
Insects described in 1899
Taxa named by Gabriel Strobl